The 1997 NCAA Division I baseball season, play of college baseball in the United States organized by the National Collegiate Athletic Association (NCAA) began in the spring of 1997.  The season progressed through the regular season and concluded with the 1997 College World Series.  The College World Series, held for the fifty first time in 1997, consisted of one team from each of eight regional competitions and was held in Omaha, Nebraska, at Johnny Rosenblatt Stadium as a double-elimination tournament.  LSU claimed the championship for the fourth time.

Realignment
The Big Eight Conference merged with four members of the Southwest Conference, Baylor, Texas, Texas A&M, and Texas Tech to form the Big 12 Conference.

Format changes
The Big West Conference divided into two divisions of four, called Northern and Southern.

Conference winners
This is a partial list of conference champions from the 1997 season.  The NCAA sponsored regional competitions to determine the College World Series participants.  Each of the eight regionals consisted of six teams competing in double-elimination tournaments, with the winners advancing to Omaha.  In order to provide all conference champions with an automatic bid, 10 conference champions participated in a play-in round.  The five winners joined the other 19 conference champions with automatic bids, 24 teams earned at-large selections.

Conference standings
The following is an incomplete list of conference standings:

College World Series

The 1997 season marked the fifty first NCAA Baseball Tournament, which culminated with the eight team College World Series.  The College World Series was held in Omaha, Nebraska.  The eight teams played a double-elimination format, with LSU claiming their fourth championship with a 13–6 win over Alabama in the final.

Bracket

Award winners

All-America team

References